Ijaz Ahmed or Ejaz Ahmed may refer to:

 Ijaz Ahmed (cricketer, born 1949), Pakistani cricketer
 Ijaz Ahmed (cricketer, born 1957), Pakistani cricketer
 Ijaz Ahmed (cricketer, born 1960), Pakistani cricketer
 Ijaz Ahmed (cricketer, born 1968), Pakistani cricketer
 Ijaz Ahmed (cricketer, born 1969), Pakistani cricketer
 Ijaz Ahmad (cricketer) (born 2004), Afghan cricketer
 Ejaz Ahmed Chaudhary (born 1956), Pakistan tehreek e insaf politician
 Ijaz Ahmed (wushu) (born 1981), Pakistani wushu practitioner
 Muhammed Ijaz Khan, Pakistani formerly held at the Guantanamo Bay detention camps
 Ejaz Ahmed (politician), Pakistani politician